Thredbo is a village and ski resort in the Snowy Mountains of New South Wales, Australia. The village is built in the valley of the Thredbo River, also known as the Crackenback River, at the foot of the Ramshead Range.

The town has approximately 4,150 beds, but a permanent population of only approximately 477 people. When the mountain is fully covered by snow, Thredbo has the longest ski runs in Australia, attracting approximately 700,000 winter visitors annually. In summer, Thredbo is a hiking and summer sport destination, offering rock climbing and abseiling, fishing, cross-country cycling and downhill MTB riding and hosts a blues music festival, with approximately 300,000 summer visitors (figures are ).

Thredbo resort was developed by a syndicate of people who were at the time working on the Snowy Mountains Hydro-Electric Scheme. In 1957, the syndicate was granted a head-lease over the area that Thredbo now occupies. Development occurred in the following years under Lend Lease Corporation. In January 1987, Amalgamated Holdings Limited (AHL) (now known as Event Hospitality and Entertainment) purchased the head lease from Lend Lease. Event Hospitality and Entertainment operates Thredbo village's services, real estate, and lease arrangements as a public company; however, a range of private businesses operate around the year providing activities, shopping, restaurants, accommodation, tours and nightlife.

History

The origin of the name “Thredbo” has been attributed to the Aboriginal inhabitants of the Snowy Mountains.

Ski resort

Thredbo is an Australian ski resort set within Kosciuszko National Park in NSW and was modelled on a European skiing town, reflecting the heritage of workers on the Snowy Mountains Scheme such as Tony Sponar, who is credited with having established the location as a ski field.
 Contrasting with the primarily lodge-based Perisher, Thredbo is a town with lodges, shopping and nightlife. Thredbo has 14 lifts: an 8-person gondola, 3 hi-speed quads, 1 quad, 5 t-bars, 1 double chair (following the removal of Merritts Chairlift in 2020, and the Ramshead Chairlift in 2010), and 3 snow runners.

Thredbo has the steepest overall terrain of any ski resort in mainland Australia, and also the highest lifted point ( AHD). From this highest access point at Karel's T-Bar, the lease-holder Kosciuszko Thredbo and private adventure companies have access for backcountry ski tours to Mt. Kosciuszko and multiple other locations on the Main Range. Thredbo Village sits at the base of the Crackenback Valley, and due to its low altitude the ski resort does not always retain snow on the lower half of the mountain as a result of higher temperatures, although temperature inversions at night and below zero temperatures enable snow making. Because of this, Thredbo has invested almost $6 million in the largest snowmaking system in the Southern Hemisphere, covering some 65 hectares of trail and using a three-stage automated process. The system is operated mainly at night to top up the lower half of the mountain and any other high traffic areas. The automated areas include the Supertrail, Friday Flat, High Noon, The Cruiser area's Walkabout and Ballroom, Sundowner, Lovers Leap bypass, World Cup, and Lower True Blue.

Thredbo has over 50 ski runs and employs a standard 3-colour grade system; green for beginners, blue intermediate and black diamond advanced. The longest continual run is from the top of Karel's T-Bar to Friday Flat and is 5.9 km long; however, this is composed of several trails. The longest single run is the Crackenback Supertrail, which is the longest run in Australia.

During the Vietnam War, Australia was one of the destinations soldiers could pick for a week-long R & R. At the Sydney airport, the USO had different activities that could be chosen if the soldier wished. One option was skiing at Thredbo at a reduced rate. The package included round trip transportation (part by air, part bus), lodging, breakfast and dinner, equipment, a group lesson, and a lift ticket. Also included were gloves, ski pants, and a warm jacket; soldiers in Vietnam didn't have any of these items, and so needed them to be furnished.

At the end of the season, mats were placed on the lower slopes, enabling one to ski to the bottom.

The village offers a free shuttle bus service during winter that links the Valley Terminal, Friday Flat, and the majority of the ski lodges throughout the village.

Lifts

Terrain parks
Thredbo has several terrain parks;
Wombat World— a terrain park for younger children, which has a few bumps, fun boxes and arches. Located on Friday Flat.
Merritts Park— A terrain park for beginners to intermediates, which contains a few jumps and boxes. It is located at the base of the Cruiser chairlift, and can be accessed from the Merritts Mountain House Restaurant. A T-bar runs from the bottom for escape from this park.
Cruiser Park — This park has a series of rails, boxes, big jumps and a picnic table. It is regularly changed to challenge the rider. Located just below the top of "The Cruiser" chair.
Antons Park— A terrain park for experienced freestyle skiers and boarders with large jumps, rails and a wall ride. Located on Antons.
Ridercross— Changes location from year to year.

Gunbarrel Express chairlift
The Gunbarrel Express is a detachable quad chairlift in Thredbo. It runs from the Friday Flat beginners area to a point on The Traverse trail roughly halfway between the Central Spur and the Merritts Spur. The lift was constructed in 1988 as part of a thirty million (Australian) dollar investment in the mountain by its new owners, Amalgamated Holdings Limited. It is unique in Thredbo in that it crosses over other lifts, namely the Easy Does It fixed-grip quad and the Merritts fixed-grip double. This chairlift provides good access to a variety of runs and is convenient to the Woodridge and Friday Flat lodges, as well as major carparks.

Two runs, The Glades and Pegasus, run underneath the higher part of the Gunbarrel Express, with the former running into the latter. The lower half is significantly steeper, with many concealed obstacles, including a creek. It often suffers from only partial cover and is out-of-bounds for most of the season with it only opening up after significant snowfall.

Statistics:
Base elevation: 
Base location: Friday Flat
Terminal elevation: 
Terminal location: The Traverse, approx. halfway between Cruiser terminal and Antons base.
Length: 
Vertical Rise: 
Average gradient: 1 in 3.9

Future Developments 

 The new Doppelmayr Merritts Gondola will become Australia's first purpose-built Gondola
 The Merritts Gondola is a high speed, eight person Gondola that will quadruple the capacity of the current Merritts Chairlift, lifting approximately 2,000 people per hour
 The new Gondola will transport skiers, snowboarders and sightseers from the village to the intermediate and beginner terrain of the Cruiser area. The Cruiser area also has access to some of the resort's advanced trails like Dream Run, meaning the Gondola will benefit all levels of skier and snowboarders, as well as sightseers
 There'll be a mid-station close to the base of the High Noon trail, allowing guests to access Friday Flat or alternatively load to get to the Cruiser area or to Thredbo Village
 Travel time from the Village to the Cruiser area is approximately six minutes, saving 15 minutes on current times
 Construction will commence in October 2019, following the current 2019 winter
 Guests to Thredbo in 2019 can sneak a peek inside the new Gondola with a Doppelmayr cabin on display at Friday Flat from mid-August 2019
 Snowmaking will be added to the popular 'Dream Run' for the 2020 winter, allowing more reliable access to Friday Flat and the mid-station of the Gondola
 Planning is well under way for the construction of additional car parking spaces this summer as Thredbo recognizes that the increasing popularity of the resort means parking is at a premium during our peak periods
 A number of other major development applications have been submitted to the NSW Department of Planning and Environment. These will see substantial investment over the next few years to develop and enhance some of the most popular areas of the resort, including:
 the development of a new Friday Flat retail and rental facility;
 the redevelopment and expansion of 'Thredboland', Thredbo's children program center for snow sports
 additional car parking at Friday Flat.

These multi-million dollar developments, when completed, will provide guests with some of the best facilities in the Australian snow industry, further enhancing Thredbo's award-winning reputation as Australia's premier snow resort.

1997 Thredbo landslide

Eighteen people died when the Bimbadeen and Carinya lodges collapsed at Thredbo Alpine Village at 11:30 pm on 30 July 1997. John Cameron, a member of Brindabella Ski Club, and 17 residents of Bimbadeen Ski Lodge lost their lives when Carinya (owned by the Brindabella Ski Club) and Bimbadeen Lodges collapsed when the slope above Carinya Lodge slipped downhill, destroying Carinya. Bimbadeen Staff Lodge was then hit, and it too collapsed. Witnesses reported hearing "a whoosh of air, a crack and a sound like a freight train rushing the hill". The sole survivor, Stuart Diver, was pulled from the wreckage after lying trapped for three days. Stuart was confined to a small space between two concrete slabs where his wife, Sally, drowned beside him in a torrent of water, which Stuart was able to keep his face above.

The landslide was caused by a water leak from a ruptured water pipe that ran alongside the Alpine Road situated above the two lodges. The leaking water pipe caused the ground to become lubricated, allowing the top layer to slip away from the lower part.

Brindabella Ski Club opened its new lodge on 5 June 2004.

Climate
The climate of the area is typical of the Snowy Mountains, cold snowy winters and mild summers (summer snow is not unheard-of in Thredbo). The village receives an average of 34.9 snowy days annually. The village is sheltered from the prevailing westerlies, as evident by its mild winter maximum temperatures and low relative humidity for its elevation.

In Köppen climate classification Thredbo Village would fit the criteria of having a cool oceanic climate (Cfb), though bordering on a subpolar oceanic climate (Cfc); with mild summers and cold, snowy winters; with a lack of temperature extremes.

It is one of the coldest stations on mainland Australia by maximum temperatures, second only to Mount Hotham which is lower in elevation but more exposed than Thredbo. On average, the Top Station receives 56.9 snowy days annually.

In Köppen climate classification terms, Thredbo Top Station would fit the criteria of having a subpolar oceanic climate (Cfc); one with short, cool summers and long, cold winters. It is bordering on a Subantarctic climate (Dfc), as the mean temperature in its coolest month approaches .

Climate data for the area are taken from a station at the village at the bottom of the ski resort and another station at the top of the mountain—some  higher.

On 3 February 2023, Thredbo Top Station reached a top of just  — its coldest high summer maximum on record.

Thredbo Top Station

Other sporting activities

Thredbo Leisure Centre
It has been used by the many high-profile athletes, including the Australian Institute of Sport for high-altitude training in the lead up to the 2008 Olympic Games in Beijing.

Mountain biking
Since the early 1990s, Thredbo has been popular during the summertime for recreational and competitive mountain biking, attracting serious racers from across Australia and overseas. There are kilometres of cross country singletrack and firetrail around Thredbo Village, the Thredbo golf course, and other trails connecting Thredbo to its neighbouring villages. Two local businesses operate cross-country mountain bike tours from Thredbo and across the Snowy Mountains region.

Thredbo is host to the world-renowned downhill track, the Cannonball Run, which is accessed by taking the Kosciusko Express Quad-Chairlift up to Eagles Nest. The Cannonball Run is host to many races through the summer months, including national rounds, state rounds, the National Interschools Mountain Biking Competition. Track engineering has made a significant difference to the sustainability of downhill mountain biking in a sensitive alpine environment. Two Gravity Trails have been opened at Thredbo in the past 510 years, the Kosciuszko Flow Trail and the All Mountain Train offering a more varied level of riding from the technical Cannonball. The All Mountain Trail connects the National Parks and Wildlife Service installed Thredbo Valley Track, which follows the course of the Thredbo River from Thredbo Village through Ranger Station, Ngarigo Campgrounds and the Diggings Campgrounds to terminate at Lake Crackenback Resort.

The Thredbo Mountain-cross track, designed by Glen Jacobs, an Australian trail expert, opened in 2005. It is situated on Friday Flat and comprises a start gate, multiple doubles, rollers, berms, moguls, gaps, step-downs and step-ups. The track has hosted numerous races since its opening including national rounds, state rounds and the National Interschools Mountain Biking Competition.

See also

Skiing in Australia

References

External links

Thredbo official site
Thredbo events, accommodation and things to do on VisitNSW.com, official NSW Tourism Website.
 Details of every ski lift to run at Thredbo in the Australian Ski Lift Directory

Ski areas and resorts in New South Wales
Towns in New South Wales
Year of establishment missing
Snowy Monaro Regional Council